Andrzej Małysiak (born June 30, 1957) is a former Polish ice hockey player. He played for the Poland men's national ice hockey team at the 1980 Winter Olympics in Lake Placid. During the 1982 World Championship Group B tournament in Austria, Małysiak defected along with two other Polish players, Justyn Denisiuk and Bogusław Maj.

References

1957 births
Living people
Ice hockey players at the 1980 Winter Olympics
Olympic ice hockey players of Poland
People from Mysłowice
Polish defectors
GKS Katowice (ice hockey) players
GKS Tychy (ice hockey) players
ERC Ingolstadt players
Polish ice hockey centres
Sportspeople from Silesian Voivodeship